Seguenziopsis is a genus of minute sea snails, marine gastropod mollusks or micromollusks in the family Seguenziidae.

The name Seguenziopsisis derived from Seguenzia and the Ancient Greek word  opsis (= appearance).

Species
Species within the genus Seguenziopsis include:
Seguenziopsis bicorona Marshall, 1983

References

 

 
Seguenziidae